Ashot I (c. 820 – 890) was an Armenian king who oversaw the beginning of Armenia's second golden age (862 – 977). He was the son of Smbat VIII the Confessor and was a member of the Bagratuni Dynasty.

Life

Early life
Ashot was born around 820 to Smbat VIII Bagratuni and his wife Hripsime. Smbat VIII was sparapet (supreme commander) and the son of Ashot Msaker, the Prince of Armenia (r. 806–826). Ashot also had a brother named Abas. The family, the Bagratunis, was one of the most powerful in the kingdom, along with the Artsruni. Both families struggled for power through warfare against Arab invaders. The kingdom was later taken over by Armenians who overthrew the Arab government. Smbat VIII was exiled to Samarra, where he later died. Ashot continued to live in his father's quarters, located around the city of Bagaran. He was married to Katranide. Like Smbat before him, Ashot was named sparapet in 856 by the Abbasid Caliph al-Mutawakkil.

Prince of princes of Armenia

During the Arab-Byzantine Wars, much of Ashot's territory was located near the main site of conflict. In 862, Ashot was recognized as the prince of princes of Armenia by Abbasid Caliph al-Musta'in, who saw this as a measure of protection against the local autonomous emirs. This title essentially granted Ashot the status of de facto king and placed him at a similar level of power as the emirs, but did not allow Ashot to have administrative rule over the kingdom. Ashot kept this status during the reigns of Abbasid Caliphs al-Mu'tazz (866–869), al-Muhtadi (869–870) and al-Mu'tamid (870–892).

Ashot annexed Bagrevand in 862, shortly after the death of the ruling Mamikonian dynasty's head, Grigor Mamikonian. Ashot mediated between Grigor-Derenik Artsruni and Gurgen Artsruni, cousins and members of the Artsruni family who controlled Vaspurakan. Ashot then captured Grigor-Derenik and reduced the size of the cantons around Van. Ashot released Grigor-Derenik to avoid further conflict with the Artsruni family. Ashot later arranged a marriage between his daughter, Sophie, and Grigor-Derenik, in order to reconcile. Ashot also strengthened relations with the Siunia Dynasty by arranging another marriage between his second daughter, Mariam, with Prince Vasak Gabur IV. These familial ties helped strengthen relations between Ashot's sons and the surrounding dynasties.

Ashot used this support to wage war against the emirs. He began by defeating the Kaysites of Manazkert in 863, with the help of his brother and sparapet, Abas Bagratuni. In 877, he began to fight against the emir of Barda alongside his ostikan; however, failure of this ostikan led to his replacement. The new ostikan made a secret peace treaty with the emir and betrayed Ashot. Ashot learned of the conspiracy against him and sent Abas to disarm the ostikan in Dvin; Abas escorted him to the border under Ashot's orders in order to prevent the caliph's retaliation. Ashot defeated the emirs of Barda and Manazkert, laying siege to the latter city in 884; however, the siege was ceased prematurely. The siege caused Grigor-Derenik to worry about the borders of Taron, which was under Grigor-Derenik's control. Ashot gained control of the Gugark and Utik regions as early as 860.

Ashot's reach also extended to Caucasian Iberia, where some of his Bagratuni family had settled in the late 7th century. There, around 875, he formed an alliance with Bagrat I of Iberia, his stepbrother, against Bagrat's brother, Guaram Mampali. Together, Ashot and Bagrat defeated Guaram. In 881, Ashot formed an alliance with David I of Iberia and Adarnase IV of Iberia, Bagrat's son and grandson, respectively, to defeat Guaram's son, Nasra of Tao-Klarjeti.

King of Armenia

Several contemporary prominent Armenians, including Grigor-Derenik Vaspurakan, insisted on Ashot's coronation. Ashot was crowned King of Armenia through the consent of Caliph al-Mu'tamid in 885 to prevent intrusion into Armenian territory by Basil I, a Byzantine emperor of Armenian origin. As a result of his coronation, Ashot restored the Armenian monarchy and became the founder of the medieval Kingdom of Armenia, also known as Bagratid Armenia, named after the contemporary rule of the Bagratunis. The Bagratid kingdom lasted until 1045, when it was annexed into the Byzantine Empire.

Despite his status, Ashot remained a subordinate to the Caliph and was put under the supervision of the emirs of Azerbaijan. Every Armenian prince fell under Ashot's authority (though in the effect of primus inter pares). Dvin and the emirates of Manazkert and Karin (and, according to Constantine VII, Khoy and Salmas) also fell under Ashot's control, despite the local governments' unwillingness to accept. The emir of Manazkert was in this way defeated and was forced to submit to Ashot's rule in 885.

Ashot's influence continued not only in Armenia but also in Iberia. After the death of Grigor-Derenik Artsruni in 887, Ashot placed his own grandson (and Grigor-Derenik's son), Ashot-Sargis Artsruni, under the rule of relative Gagik Aboumerwan Artsruni. In 887 and 888, Ashot supported his nephew Adarnase IV of Iberia in overthrowing Bagrat I of Abkhazia. Also in 888, Ashot sent his brother Abas to Kars to stop a rebellion led by Prince Sahak-Mleh of Vanand.

Ashot travelled to Gugark to stop another rebellion, fighting alongside his son and heir, Smbat I. He died in 890. Contemporary historian Hovhannes Draskhanakerttsi gives an account of his death:

Smbat I succeeded him.

Armenian growth under rule
Ashot's restoration of the Armenian monarchy was accompanied by economic growth and a revival of the arts and religion. Several cultural buildings were restored and renovated. Under Ashot's reign, the first khachkar was created in 879 as a tribute to Ashot's wife, Katranide. Urban growth began to occur and agriculture flourished. Vineyards became a very successful industry.

Religious affairs

Ashot supported the Armenian Apostolic Church during his reign. Ashot saw the possibility of the church merging with the Orthodox Byzantine Church, due to the Byzantine Empire's influence in the region, and feared that the Byzantine Empire would deny him his claim to the throne. In 862, when the Ecumenical Patriarch of Constantinople Photios I attempted to unite the Armenian Church by sending two letters to Catholicos Zacharias I and Ashot, Zacharias and Ashot summoned a council in Yerazgavors; the ambiguous response was formulated by Ashot. Ashot continued to receive epistolary communication; in 882, he received a letter with a piece of the True Cross awarded to Catholicos Mashtots I, who was a friend of Ashot (the cross has since been lost). Ashot also supported the Armenian Church's desire to separate from the Church of Caucasian Albania. Ashot donated several treasures to the Armenian Catholicos to distribute to the churches.

Family

Notes

References

 
 
 
 
 
 
 
 
 
 
 
 
 
 
 

820s births
890 deaths
9th-century kings of Armenia
Bagratuni dynasty
Kings of Bagratid Armenia
9th-century monarchs in Asia
Place of birth unknown
9th-century Armenian people
Vassal rulers of the Abbasid Caliphate